Calymene tristani is a trilobite belonging to the order Phacopida family Calymene. These trilobites lived in the Ordovician and Silurian periods.

References
Paleobiology Database
Sepkoski, Jack Sepkoski's Online Genus Database
Organism Names
C. tristani at Neosci-gw.museum

Calymenidae
Ordovician England
Silurian England
Fossils of England
Fossils of Spain